Baraka Djoma SSG is a football club from Conakry, Guinea. They play in the Guinean Second Division, which is the second league in Guinean football.

In 2009 the team has won the Guinée Coupe Nationale.

Stadium 
Currently the team plays at the 1000 capacity Stade Municipal de Coléah.

Achievements

National titles
Guinée Coupe Nationale: 1
Winner: 2009

Performance in CAF competitions 
CAF Confederation Cup: 1 appearance
2010 – Preliminary Round

References

External links 

Football clubs in Guinea